Blazhe Ilijoski, nicknamed Bazhe (born 9 July 1984) is a Macedonian football player who plays as a forward.

Club career

FC Gifu
On 25 July 2013, Ilijoski signed for J2 League club FC Gifu.

Bangkok Glass

On 9 July 2014 Ilijoski score 2 goals on his debut with Bangkok Glass FC in ThaiCom FA Cup 1/8 round over Buriram United

Kelantan FA

On 27 January 2016, Ilijoski was revealed as Malaysia Super League side, Kelantan FA new signing. On 13 February 2015 Ilijoski made his debut as a professional player at Malaysia Super League against Perak TBG but the results ended in a 0–0 draw. He scored his first goal at minute 83 against UKM F.C. at Malaysia FA Cup competition on 20 February 2016. He scored his first goal in Malaysia Super League against Sarawak FA which ended in 2–2 draw with him scoring both the goal and becoming the man of the match on 26 February 2016. He gain his first hat-trick in a league match against Terengganu FA which resulted in 1–6 victory for the away team (Kelantan FA) with him scoring 4 of them with the rest each scored by Wander Luiz and Wan Zack Haikal.

Malaysia Super League statistics

International career
He made his senior debut for Macedonia in a November 2005 friendly match against Liechtenstein, in which he immediately scored a goal, and has earned a total of 14 caps, scoring 1 goal. His final international was a November 2015 friendly against Lebanon.

Honours
Rabotnički
Macedonian First League: 2004–05, 2005–06, 2007–08, 2013–14
Macedonian Football Cup: 2007–08, 2008–09, 2013–14, 2014–15
Metalurg Skopje
 Macedonian Football Cup: 2010–11
Bangkok Glass F.C.
 Thai FA Cup: 2014
Pelister
 Macedonian Football Cup: 2016–17

References

External links

Profile at Macedonian Football 

1984 births
Living people
Footballers from Skopje
Association football forwards
Macedonian footballers
North Macedonia youth international footballers
North Macedonia under-21 international footballers
North Macedonia international footballers
FK Rabotnički players
Incheon United FC players
FK Metalurg Skopje players
Gangwon FC players
FC Brașov (1936) players
FC Rapid București players
FC Gifu players
Blazhe Ilijoski
Kelantan FA players
FK Pelister players
FK Shkupi players
Macedonian First Football League players
K League 1 players
Liga I players
J2 League players
Malaysia Super League players
Blazhe Ilijoski
Macedonian expatriate footballers
Expatriate footballers in South Korea
Macedonian expatriate sportspeople in South Korea
Expatriate footballers in Romania
Macedonian expatriate sportspeople in Romania
Expatriate footballers in Japan
Macedonian expatriate sportspeople in Japan
Expatriate footballers in Thailand
Macedonian expatriate sportspeople in Thailand
Expatriate footballers in Malaysia
Macedonian expatriate sportspeople in Malaysia